Shruthi Ram, known by her stage name Tanvi Ram, is an Indian actor working primarily in the Malayalam cinema. She was a Miss Kerala 2012 finalist.

Personal life
Tanvi was born and brought up in Bengaluru. She completed her studies from New Horizon College and started working with Deutsche Bank and later joined HSBC Bank, Bengaluru.

Career
Tanvi started her career as a banking professional and landed her first role in the movie Ambili in a major role acting with Soubin Shahir. She also acted in the 2020 movie Kappela.
She marked her debut in Telugu cinema opposite Nani

Filmography

References

Living people
Year of birth missing (living people)
People from Kerala
Actresses in Malayalam cinema
Actresses in Telugu cinema